Crashaw is a surname. Notable people with the surname include:

 Richard Crashaw ( 1613–1649), English poet, teacher, Anglican cleric, and Catholic convert
 William Crashaw (1572–1626), English cleric, academic, and poet

See also
 Cranshaw